Zora Singh Maan (born 18 June 1940) was a member of the 14th Lok Sabha of India. He represented the Firozpur constituency of Punjab and was a member of the Shiromani Akali Dal (SAD) political party.

References

External links
 Member Profile - Parliament of India website

Living people
1940 births
Indian Sikhs
India MPs 2004–2009
People from Firozpur
Shiromani Akali Dal politicians
India MPs 1998–1999
India MPs 1999–2004
Lok Sabha members from Punjab, India